This is a list of Swiss football transfers for the 2022–23 winter transfer window. Only transfers featuring Czech First League are listed.

Czech First League

Note: Flags indicate national team as has been defined under FIFA eligibility rules. Players may hold more than one non-FIFA nationality.

Viktoria Plzeň

In:

Out:

Slavia Prague

In:

Out:

Sparta Prague

In:

Out:

Slovácko

In:

Out:

Baník Ostrava

In:

Out:

Hradec Králové

In:

Out:

Mladá Boleslav

In:

Out:

Slovan Liberec

In:

Out:

Sigma Olomouc

In:

Out:

České Budějovice

In:

Out:

Pardubice

In:

Out:

Trinity Zlín

In:

Out:

Jablonec

In:

Out:

Bohemians 1905

In:

Out:

Teplice

In:

Out:

Zbrojovka Brno

In:

Out:

See also
 2022–23 Czech First League

References

External links
 Official site of the FAČR
 Official site of the Czech First League

Czech Republic
Transfers